Santa Elena may refer to:

Inhabited places
Santa Elena, Entre Ríos, Argentina
Santa Elena, Cayo, Belize
Santa Elena, Corozal, Belize, a village in on the Belize–Mexico border
Santa Elena, Toledo, a municipality in Toledo, Belize
Santa Elena, a township in Medellín, Colombia
Santa Elena, Costa Rica
Santa Elena, Ecuador
Santa Elena Province, Ecuador
Santa Elena, San Salvador, a neighborhood in San Salvador, El Salvador
Santa Elena, Usulután, El Salvador
Santa Elena, El Petén, Guatemala
Santa Elena, La Paz, Honduras
Santa Elena, El Petén, Guatemala
Santa Elena, Chiapas, locality in the city of Ocosingo, Mexico
Santa Elena Municipality, Yucatán, Mexico
Santa Elena, Paraguay
Santa Elena, Virú, Peru
Santa Elena, Camarines Norte, Philippines
Santa Elena, Marikina, Philippines
Santa Elena, Samar, Philippines
Santa Elena, Spain
Santa Elena de Jamuz, Castile and León, Spain
Santa Elena, Texas, United States
Santa Elena (Spanish Florida), modern Parris Island, South Carolina, United States
Santa Elena de Uairén, Bolívar, Venezuela

Other uses
 Santa Elena River, in Nor Cinti Province, Bolivia
 Santa Elena (Mexibús), a BRT station in Chimalhuacán, State of Mexico

See also
 Santa Elena District (disambiguation)
 Sant'Elena (disambiguation)
 Saint Helena (disambiguation)